Pagar Alam (sometimes written as Pagaralam,), is a city in South Sumatra, Indonesia. Before established as a definitive city, Pagaralam was an administrative city in Lahat Regency. It has an area of 633.66 km² and a population of 126,181 at the 2010 Census and 143,844 at the 2020 Census.

Pagaralam is located by the Bukit Barisan Mountains, at the feet of Mount Dempo, a volcano and the highest mountain in South Sumatra. It is 298 km southwest from the province capital city of Palembang and 60 km southwest of Lahat. The city is bounded by Bengkulu Province to the south, Jarai District to the north, Kota Agung District to the east and Tanjung Sakti Pumi District to the west. Pagaralam is the one of the main suppliers of vegetables in Palembang. Its location in the highland makes the city slightly cooler than many of the other South Sumatra cities; this, together with its astounding landscape, makes the city one of the main tourist destinations in South Sumatra and it is often visited by local tourists, especially from Palembang. Currently, the city is led by Alpian Maskoni as the mayor of the city.

Geography
Pagaralam is located by the Bukit Barisan Mountains, at the feet of Mount Dempo. Much of the soil in the city consists of latosol and andisol with rugged and hilly topography. The soil in this city is classified as soil with high fertility (class I).

Demography
In 2000, Pagaralam population was only 112,025 and it increased to 126,181 ten years later, and 143,844 after a further decade. One of the factors in the population increase has been the settlement of migrants who want to live in this city. Beside the city's native inhabitants, the Malay (Besemah), the city population also consists of several other groups, such as the Javanese, Minang, Batak, Chinese, Arabs, and Indians.

Administrative Districts
Pagar Alam is administratively divided into five districts (kecamatan), tabulated below with their 2010 Census  and 2020 Census populations. The table also includes the number of administrative villages (rural desa and urban kelurahan) in each district, and its postal codes.

Note: (a) excluding the kelurahan of Sukorejo, which has a post code of 31551.

Climate
Pagar Alam has an elevation moderated tropical rainforest climate (Af) with heavy rainfall year-round.

Transportation

Atung Bungsu Airport
Atung Bungsu Airport is the only airport in Pagar Alam. It is opened on 28 February 2013. With air transport it now is less than one hour from Palembang, instead of eight hours using land transportation.

Education

Colleges 
 Sekolah Tinggi Ilmu Tarbiyah (STIT)
 Sekolah Tinggi Keguruan & Ilmu Pendidikan (STKIP) Muhammadiyah Pagar Alam
 Sekolah Tinggi Ilmu Ekonomi (STIE) Lembah Dempo Pagar Alam]
 Sekolah Tinggi Teknologi Pagaralam (STTP) Simpang Mbacang

Tourism
Beside its landscapes, the city also offer heritage tourism with a lot of megalithic sites. The Pagaralam government will build an integrated tourism area in a 26 hectare bamboo forest at Curup Jahe in North Pagaralam.

References

External links